Dahlbreen is a glacier in Oscar II Land at Spitsbergen, Svalbard. It is named after whaler Thor Dahl. The glacier has a length of about fifteen kilometers, extending from Løvenskioldfonna to Forlandsundet. Among its tributary glaciers are Ujamnbreen, Bærumbreen and Fjelgbreen. Retreatment of the glacier has formed the bay of Dahlbrebukta.

References

Glaciers of Spitsbergen